Stott's College is a private college in Australia. The primary campus is located in Melbourne, with three other campuses located in Sydney, Brisbane,  and Perth.

Overview 
Stott's College offers both higher education and vocational training. Each campus offers training in community service while Melbourne and Perth campus offer additional training relating to business and accounting.

History 

Stott's College was established by its principal Mr. Sydney Stott. Starting as a single campus, Stott's College extended its operations across Australia and New Zealand.

More recently, Stott's College was purchased by Acknowledge Education Pty Ltd.

Course background 
The courses that were initially offered by Stott's College were catered towards both adult and high school students.

Campuses 
Stott's College was first established in its Melbourne campus, 54 Market St. Stott's College had campuses across other major cities in Australia and New Zealand including Adelaide, Perth, Sydney, Brisbane, Auckland, and Dunedin.

Due to the growth of the Melbourne campus, it was moved from 54 Market St to a larger building in 96–100 Russell St.

The current Melbourne campus is located in 168 Exhibition St. This move was due to the growth of the Stott's College and other schools under Acknowledge Education. The current Sydney campus was established in 2015. The current Perth campus was established in 2017. Stott's newest campus, based in Brisbane, opened for students in 2020.

References

External links 
 

Business schools in Australia